An inclined rig is a method of rigging a sail to direct the force of the sails in such a way as to reduce heeling.

See also
Bruce foil

Sailing rigs and rigging